A Princess of Destiny is a 1929 MGM short silent film short in two-color Technicolor. It was the eleventh and penultimate film produced as part of Metro-Goldwyn-Mayer's "Great Events" series.

Production
The film was shot at the Tec-Art Studio in Hollywood. Early versions of the script used the titles A Royal Lover and The Royal Duckling.

Preservation Status
A Princess of Destiny is believed to be lost.

References

External links 

1929 films
American silent short films
Cultural depictions of Henry VIII
Cultural depictions of Anne Boleyn
Cultural depictions of the wives of Henry VIII
Films about Henry VIII
Films set in the 16th century
Films set in Tudor England
Metro-Goldwyn-Mayer short films
Silent films in color
Lost American films
Films directed by Tom Terriss
1920s American films